Membury may refer to:

 Membury, Devon, a village in Devon
Membury Castle, an Iron Age hillfort situated above the village of Membury, Devon
RAF Membury, a former World War II airfield built in the civil parish of Lambourn, Berkshire
Membury services, a service station on the M4 motorway on the original site of the RAF Membury
Membury transmitting station, a broadcasting and telecommunications facility at Membury services 
Membury Camp, an Iron Age hillfort situated next to RAF Membury, and on the borders of Wiltshire and Berkshire